Deh-e Zanan (also Romanized as Deh-e Zanān and Deh Zanān; also known as Deh Zamān, Deh Zanān-e Gīpūm, and Kalāt-i-Deh Zanūn) is a village in Heruz Rural District, Kuhsaran District, Ravar County, Kerman Province, Iran. At the 2006 census, its population was 184, in 48 families.

References 

Populated places in Ravar County